Colligyrus is a genus of small freshwater snails that have an operculum, aquatic gastropod mollusks in the family Hydrobiidae.

Species
Species within the genus Colligyrus include:

Colligyrus convexus Hershler, Frest, Liu, and Johannes, 2003 
Colligyrus depressus Herschler, 1999 - Harney Basin duskysnail
Colligyrus greggi (Pilsbry, 1935) - type species

References

Hydrobiidae
Taxonomy articles created by Polbot